FC Iskra ("FC Spark") may refer to:

FK Iskra Borčice, Slovak football club
FK Iskra Danilovgrad, Montenegrin football club
FC Iskra Engels, Russian football club
FC Iskra Kazan, name of FC Rubin Kazan from 1958 to 1964
FC Iskra Novoaleksandrovsk, Russian football club
FC Iskra Rîbnița, Moldovan football club
FC Iskra Smolensk, Russian football club
FC Iskra-Stal, Moldovan football club